Pseudopamera is a genus of dirt-colored seed bugs in the family Rhyparochromidae. There are about nine described species in Pseudopamera.

Species
These nine species belong to the genus Pseudopamera:
 Pseudopamera ater (Distant, 1893)
 Pseudopamera aurivilliana Distant, 1893
 Pseudopamera coleoptrata Brailovsky, 1989
 Pseudopamera coloradensis (Barber, 1921)
 Pseudopamera insititia (Distant, 1893)
 Pseudopamera nitidicollis (Stal, 1874)
 Pseudopamera nitidula (Uhler, 1893)
 Pseudopamera rubricata (Barber, 1921)
 Pseudopamera setosa (Stal, 1874)

References

External links

 

Rhyparochromidae
Articles created by Qbugbot